Disability etiquette is a set of guidelines dealing specifically with how to approach a person with a disability.

There is no consensus on when this phrase first came into use, although it most likely grew out of the Disability Rights Movement that began in the early 1970s. The concept may have started as a cynical play on existing rule sheets, written for audiences without a disability, that were seen as patronizing by civil rights activists.

Guidelines
Most disability etiquette guidelines seem to be predicated on a simple dictate: "Do not assume ..." They are written to address real and perceived shortcomings in how society as a whole treats disabled people.

These guidelines can be broken down into the several broad categories.

"Do not assume ...":
 "... a person with a disability either wants or requires assistance."
 "... rejection of aid is meant as a personal affront."
 "... upon acceptance of your help, that you know, without being told, what service to perform."
 "... a person who appears to have one kind of disability also has others."
 "... a disabled person is dissatisfied with their quality of life, and is thus seeking pity."
 "... a person with a disability is easily offended."
 "... that a person who does not appear disabled, or who uses assistive devices intermittently instead of all of the time, is faking or imagining their disability." (See invisible disability.)
 "... companions accompanying a person with a disability are there strictly to render service."
 "... a person with a disability will be receptive to personal questions, particularly in a public setting."
 "... that when a person with a disability is in a public place, that they are being escorted by a caretaker, instead of traveling alone."

Each category encompasses specific "rules". For example, the last two of these would include guidelines such as:

 "Ask questions of the person with a disability, and not of their companions."
 "Hand grocery or other receipts to the individual who is paying the bill."
 "Only ask questions about the person's disability if you know that person."

People writing on specific disabilities have given rise to their own unique guidelines. Wheelchair users may, for example, include the rule, "do not grab the push handles of a person's wheelchair without permission." Visually impaired people often list a request to, "identify yourself when you enter a room."

Language

Like many other minority groups, disabled people do not always agree on what constitutes politically correct language, and many may have contradicting views on what they prefer. Some may prefer being referred to as 'a person with a disability' rather than as a disabled person - that preference is people-first language. The language someone uses to refer to their disability can signify whether they believe in a medical model of disability or a social model of disability.

References

Disability
Etiquette